is a fantasy-themed shoot-'em-up arcade video game released by Capcom in 1986. The player takes control of a young soldier equipped with magical wings who must save the world from a malfunctioning supercomputer. A home version for the Nintendo Entertainment System was released exclusively in North America in 1988. The original coin-op version is included in Capcom Classics Collection for PlayStation 2 and Xbox and in Capcom Classics Collection Remixed for PlayStation Portable.

Gameplay
The coin-op version of Legendary Wings can be played by up to two players simultaneously, with a second player being allowed to join the game at any time or even continue after a game over. The game's controls consist of an eight-way joystick and two buttons which changes depending on the context. The game consists of five areas with two different playing styles: the first segment in each stage is a top-view vertical scrolling segment in which the player flies across the sky, shooting at airborne enemies with their gun while dropping bombs at ground enemies, in order to reach the palace at the end of segment. When the player defeats the guardian and gains entrance to the palace, the game switches to a side-scrolling perspective, in which the player moves towards their goal on foot (by walking, crouching, and climbing ladders, as well jumping) until reaching the boss at the end, in which the player character will begin to fly with their wings again. In addition to the regular levels there are two optional levels that are accessible from the vertical-scrolling segment: a trap level in which the player is forced to escape from if they're sucked by the giant mechanical face on each area; and a hidden bonus level where the player can obtain various treasure chests to increase their score.

The player can improve their gun by destroying certain enemies or weapon capsules and picking up the "P" item stored inside. The player can power-up their character up to five levels; the first power-up will increase the player's speed; the second will change their gun to a twin shooter, as well as further increase their speed; the third power-up allows for continuous ground attacks; the fourth power-up improves the player's gun so that it shoots in three directions; and the fifth and final power-up will upgrade weapon to the "Psycho Flame" gun, which can destroy most enemies with a single shot. When the player is shot by an enemy, they will lose a life and revert to their initial power level.

PlotLegendary Wings is set in a distant future where an alien supercomputer named "Dark", which has been helping human civilization achieve a new state of enlightenment since ancient times, has suddenly rebelled against mankind. Two young warriors are given the Wings of Love and Courage by the God of War Ares in order to destroy Dark and ensure mankind's survival.

Versions

Arcade
The original Legendary Wings for the arcade was released in three different variations: a Japanese version (titled Ares no Tsubasa) and two overseas versions. The Japanese release features two different player characters whose names are shown on the game's attract sequence: "Michelle Heart", a young woman in a pink bikini-like outfit; and Kevin Walker, a young man in blue briefs. One of the two overseas versions replaces both characters with nameless male heroes, one in red trunks and the other in blue, which both wear golden wings instead of the regular white ones from the Japanese version. The second overseas version recovers the original characters, but it changes the color of Michelle's costume from pink to green.

Nintendo Entertainment System
The NES version of Legendary Wings features several significant differences from its coin-op counterpart. While the basic premise and formula remains essentially the same, several changes were made to the gameplay, particularly in how the player's power-ups work in this version. Like in the arcade game, the player can upgrade their firepower-up by picking up "P" icons hidden inside certain containers. The player can improve their character's firepower to four levels: starting with the normal gun, the player can improve it to a twin laser, a penetration beam, and a three-way flame shot. Picking up the fourth power-up will turn the player character into a Turtle Dove, which can shoot wide shots that are four times as powerful as the default gun. If the player is shot during a power-up state, it will simply revert the player to their previous power level. If the player is in Turtle Dove mode, they can withstand up to two direct hits from enemies before getting the downgrade. To continue after a game over, the player must retrieve heart icons hidden within the game's bonus levels to gain continues (up to nine continues can be stocked).

Reception

In Japan, Game Machine listed Legendary Wings on their December 15, 1986 issue as being the twelfth most-successful table arcade unit of the month.

Legacy
Michelle Heart makes an appearance in the fighting game Marvel vs. Capcom: Clash of Super Heroes as one of several support characters who assist the main fighters in combat. She also appears as a trading card in SNK's Card Fighters series. In the tactical role-playing game Namco x Capcom, the character of Sylphie (the shopkeeper from Forgotten Worlds) dresses up as Michelle Heart when she performs one of her special attacks. Michelle Heart is also featured in Project X Zone 2'' as a cameo character in Captain Commando's Solo Unit attack.

References

External links

Legendary Wings at MobyGames
Arcade History database entry

1986 video games
Arcade video games
Capcom games
Cooperative video games
Multiplayer and single-player video games
Nintendo Entertainment System games
Platform games
PlayStation Network games
Science fantasy video games
Scrolling shooters
Video games developed in Japan
Video games featuring female protagonists
Video games scored by Manami Matsumae
Video games scored by Tamayo Kawamoto
Xbox 360 Live Arcade games